Chen Anqi (born 4 June 1993) is a Chinese footballer who currently plays for China League One side Kunshan FC.

Club career
Chen Anqi started his professional football career in 2012 when he was promoted to China League One side Shenyang Dongjin's first team squad. He made nine league appearances in the 2013 season after Shenyang Dongjin were relegated to the China League Two.

Chen joined Chinese Super League side Chongqing Lifan in the 2015 season. On 25 April 2018, he made his debut for the club in a 2–0 away win over Anhui Hefei Guiguan in the 2018 Chinese FA Cup. On 2 May 2018, Chen played in another FA Cup match against Dalian Yifang with a 1–0 home defeat.

On 2 March 2019, Chen transferred to China League Two side Kunshan FC.

Career statistics
.

References

External links
 

1993 births
Living people
Chinese footballers
People from Dandong
Footballers from Liaoning
Shenyang Dongjin players
Chongqing Liangjiang Athletic F.C. players
Kunshan F.C. players
Chinese Super League players
China League One players
China League Two players
Association football goalkeepers